The Messenger is a 2009 war drama film starring Ben Foster, Woody Harrelson, Samantha Morton, Steve Buscemi, and Jena Malone. It is the directorial debut of Oren Moverman, who also wrote the screenplay with Alessandro Camon.

The film premiered at the 2009 Sundance Film Festival and was in competition at the 59th Berlin International Film Festival where it won the Silver Bear for Best Screenplay and the Berlinale Peace Film Award '09. The film received first prize for the 2009 Deauville American Film Festival. The film has also received four Independent Spirit Award nominations (including one win), a Golden Globe nomination, and two Oscar nominations.

Plot
On leave from the Iraq War, Will Montgomery, a U.S. Army staff sergeant, finds that his girlfriend Kelly is engaged to another man. Before he is to be discharged, he is dispatched as a casualty notification officer along with Gulf War veteran Captain Tony Stone as his mentor. He is told of the importance of his task by Lieutenant Colonel Dorsett as many have failed. Stone then relays the rules of telling next of kin of a tragedy. On the job, their first report to the family prompts the mother to slap Stone, as she and his pregnant fiancé weep over the deceased; a man named Dale Martin angrily throws things at Will; a woman who secretly married an enlisted man cries in his arms after learning of the man's death; a Mexican man who is told through a translator about the death of his daughter cries in front of his other child; and a woman named Olivia is in considerably less visible pain after learning of her husband's death. Stone suspects it is due to her having an affair.

In a bar, Will and Stone discuss their lives to each other. Will talks about his girlfriend rejecting him and tells Stone about his father's death due to drunk driving, along with tales of his estranged mother. Will sees Olivia with her son at a mall buying clothes for her husband's funeral, breaking up a fight between her and two Army recruiters attempting to enlist teenagers, before offering her a ride. He fixes her car and becomes friends with both her and her young son Matt. After hearing a voicemail from Kelly talking about her upcoming wedding, he punches a hole through his wall in a fit of rage. He arrives at Olivia's house and the two express affection for each other, but his attempts at physical intimacy are met with hesitancy as she tells him about how her husband mistreated her and her son.

When Will comforts a family in a local grocery store after telling them of their son's fate, Stone physically berates him for it. Will stands up to his rank by using his first name "Tony"  before walking home on his own. They later make up and spend the next few days together, where Stone has a hookup and unsuccessfully tries to get Will to do the same. They end up at Kelly's wedding drunk and make a scene, fight in a parking lot, then wake up in a forest after passing out and go home. Martin is there, and he apologizes for lashing out at Will. In Tony's apartment, Will tells Tony about his experience with a friend who died while fighting in Iraq - an event that resulted in his chronic damage to his left eye - and how he feels his bravery was meaningless as he could not do anything for him; he contemplated suicide soon after, but stopped himself when he saw the sunrise. Hearing this, Tony breaks down in tears.

The next day, Olivia decides to move from her house. She tells Will that she is going with her son to Louisiana; Will tells her he is considering staying in the army. He asks Olivia to let him know their new address; she asks him to come with her into the house.

Cast
 Ben Foster as SSG Will Montgomery
 Woody Harrelson as CPT Tony Stone
 Samantha Morton as Olivia Pitterson
 Jena Malone as Kelly
 Steve Buscemi as Dale Martin
 Yaya DaCosta as Monica Washington
 Eamonn Walker as LTC Stuart Dorsett
 Peter Francis James as Dr. Grosso
 Merritt Wever as Lara
 Gaius Charles as Recruiter Brown
 Brendan Sexton III as Recruiter Olson
 Carl Anthony Payne II as Pitterson's father
 Halley Feiffer as Marla Cohen
 Peter Friedman as Mr. Cohen
 Jeremy Strong as returning soldier
 Fiona Dourif as returning soldier's wife
 Michael Chernus as Alan

Production
The Messenger marked the directorial debut of Israeli screenwriter and former journalist Oren Moverman.  Though Sydney Pollack, Roger Michell, and Ben Affleck were all attached to direct the movie at various times, when those talks fell through, the producers eventually asked Moverman to helm the project. The filmmakers worked closely with the United States Army and the Walter Reed Medical Center to conduct research on military life, and were specifically advised by Lieutenant Colonel Paul Sinor as a technical consultant.

Release
The Messenger premiered at the 2009 Sundance Film Festival before receiving a limited release in North America in 4 theaters. It grossed $44,523 for an average of $11,131 per theater ranking 46th at the box office, and went on to earn $1.1 million domestically and $411,601 internationally for a total of $1.5 million, against its budget of $6.5 million.

Reception

Critical response
On Rotten Tomatoes, the film has an approval rating of 90%, based on 162 reviews, with an average rating of 7.51/10. The site's critical consensus states, "A dark but timely subject is handled deftly by writer/director Owen Moverman and superbly acted by Woody Harrelson and Ben Foster." On Metacritic, the film has a score of 77 out of 100, based on 32 critics, indicating "generally favorable reviews".

Harrelson's performance was subject to considerable praise, leading to Golden Globe and Oscar nominations for Best Supporting Actor.

Awards and nominations

Top ten lists
The Messenger, upon receiving strong positive reviews from audiences, appeared on several critics' top ten lists of the best films of 2009.
 3rd: Robert Mondello, NPR
 4th: Ty Burr, Boston Globe
 4th: Stephen Holden, The New York Times
 9th: Frank Scheck, The Hollywood Reporter
 10th: Peter Travers, Rolling Stone
 Top 10: David Denby, The New Yorker

References

External links
 
 
 
 
 The Messenger at Metacritic
 

2009 films
2009 romantic drama films
American war drama films
Iraq War films
Films shot in New Jersey
American romantic drama films
Films directed by Oren Moverman
Films with screenplays by Oren Moverman
Films about the United States Army
2000s war drama films
2009 directorial debut films
2009 independent films
Films about post-traumatic stress disorder
Films about veterans
Films about grieving
2000s English-language films
2000s American films